This article lists all-time records achieved in the Basketball Africa League (BAL) in major statistical categories recognised by the league, including those set by teams and individuals in a game, season, and career.

General performances

By club

By nation

All-time club rankings 
Updated after the 2022 season.

Number of participating clubs 
A total of 24 clubs from 18 associations have played in or have qualified for the BAL main tournament. Seasons in bold represents teams qualified for the playoffs in that season.

Clubs

Clubs by semi-final appearance

Medals by nation

All-time scoring leaders 
Updated in June 2022 after the 2022 season.

Terrell Stoglin is the current all-time leading scorer in BAL history, with a total of 308 points scored in two seasons. Players in bold are still active in the BAL.

Individual game records
Most points in a game
41 by Terrell Stoglin, AS Salé (vs. US Monastir) on May 11, 2022
Most rebounds in a game
22 by Mayan Kiir, Cobra Sport (vs. Zamalek) on April 9, 2022
Most assists in a game
15 by Hameed Ali, DUC (vs. AS Salé) on March 15, 2022
Most steals in a game
7 by Childe Dundão, Petro de Luanda (vs. Cobra Sport) on April 12, 2022
Most blocks in a game
6 by Anas Mahmoud, Zamalek (vs. Cobra Sport) on April 9, 2022
Most 2-point field goals made in a game
14 by Terrell Stoglin, AS Salé (vs. AS Police) on May 20, 2021
14 by Josh Nzeakor, Ferroviário de Maputo (vs. AS Salé) on May 20, 2021
Most 3-point field goals made in a game
8 by Wilson Nshobozwabyosenumukiza, REG (vs. Ferroviário da Beira) on May 15, 2022
Most free throws made in a game
11 by Terrell Stoglin, AS Salé (vs. US Monastir) on May 11, 2022

Individual season records
Highest points per game average
30.8 by Terrell Stoglin in the 2022 BAL season
Most 40-point games
2 by Terrell Stoglin

Team game records
Most points in a game
113 by US Monastir (vs. GNBC) on May 17, 2021
Fewest points in a game
46 by Patriots (vs. US Monastir) on May 29, 2021
Largest margin of victory
+47 – US Monastir defeated GNBC 66–113 on May 17, 2021
+41 – US Monastir defeated Patriots BBC 87–46 on May 29, 2021
Most 3-point field goals made in a game
20 by REG (vs. Ferroviário da Beira) 94–89 on May 15, 2022
20 by Petro de Luanda (vs Patriots) 97–68 on May 30, 2021

Playoffs 
Largest margin of playoff victory
+41 – US Monastir defeated Patriots BBC 87–46 on May 29, 2021 in the semifinals
+39 –  US Monastir defeated Cape Town Tigers 106–67 on May 22, 2022 in the quarterfinals

Team season records
Best record
6–0 by Zamalek in the 2021 season
7–1 by Zamalek & US Monastir in the 2022 season

Notes

References

records, list of